Park golf balls are used in the sport of park golf. They may be translucent or opaque and are manufactured in many different colours. Balls from different manufacturers vary significantly in the way they perform contacting the club, flying through the air and rolling on the grass.

Types of Balls

Park golf balls are divided into three categories based on their construction.

One-piece balls are made of a single kind of plastic resin, shaped into a sphere and hardened.  They are the most durable kind of ball but their performance is limited by the properties of the resin.  These balls are also the cheapest and often available as rentals at park golf courses.

Two-piece balls have an inner core and outer covering made of different materials.  By combining two materials, the advantages of both can be used in the same ball.  For example, a ball may have a durable resin core, while the outer layer offers a better feeling to the player hitting the ball.  In this way, the two-piece ball improves on the one-piece ball.  However, due to the more complicated manufacturing process, they are also more expensive.

Three-piece balls, sometimes called multi-layer balls, are constructed of several different resins and have a non-spherical core.  They are difficult to produce and are designed to have a specific characteristic (such as the ability to curve in the air or stop quickly on the green).  They are the most expensive balls on the market and currently only made by two companies, Mizuno and Asics.

Commercial Balls

In 2006, the following two- and three-piece ball were available on the market in Japan.

References

Balls
Park golf